Gander Bay South is a local service district and designated place in the Canadian province of Newfoundland and Labrador. Gander Bay was a small place in the Fogo and Twillingate area in 1864. It was north of Gander. The way office opened in 1885 and the first waymaster was John Bursey. It became a post office on May 30, 1891, and the first postmaster was James Rowsell. It had no population after 1940. They moved to Gander Bay South.

Geography 
Gander Bay South is in Newfoundland within Subdivision L of Division No. 8.

Demographics 

Government 
Gander Bay South is a local service district (LSD) that is governed by a committee responsible for the provision of certain services to the community. The chair of the LSD committee is Marvin Hodder.

See also 
List of communities in Newfoundland and Labrador
List of designated places in Newfoundland and Labrador
List of local service districts in Newfoundland and Labrador

References 

Designated places in Newfoundland and Labrador
Local service districts in Newfoundland and Labrador